is a pickled dish of dried squid and kelp, native to the Matsumae, Hokkaidō area of Hokkaidō, Japan.

It is made from fresh ingredients of Hokkaidō.  Surume (dried squid) and konbu are wiped with wet cloth and then cut into thin strips with scissors.  Kazunoko (herring roe) are chopped into small bits, and carrot and ginger are julienned.  These ingredients are then mixed with a boiled mixture of sake, soy sauce and mirin. Several slices of red pepper may be added.  The mixture is stored in a cool location for a week before eating.

Overview
As the name "Matsumae" suggests, it originated from the local cuisine of the Matsumae Domain (around present-day Matsumae Town, Matsumae District, Hokkaido). In the late Edo period, herring fishing was thriving in southern Hokkaido, and herring eggs, a number of offspring, were inexpensive food. That number of children is combined with squid and kelp and pickled with salt is the origin of matsumae pickle. In the mid-1950s, however, herring catches continued to fail and the number of calves became an expensive food. As a result, the proportion of kelp in squid increased, and the number of squid and kelp pickled only increased. Seasoning also shifted to soy sauce and seasoning liquid mainly blended with soy sauce due to changes in taste preferences.

References

Japanese pickles
Japanese seafood